Ivington Camp is an Iron Age hill fort located at Brierley, 3 km south of Leominster, Herefordshire.

Further reading
Children, G; Nash, G (1994) Prehistoric Sites of Herefordshire Logaston Press

External links
Ivington Camp at PastScape
Ivington Camp Monument Detail

Hill forts in Herefordshire
Iron Age sites in England